Plješevica can refer to:

 Plješevica mountain in Croatia and at the border with Bosnia and Herzegovina
 Plješevica hill near Visoko, one of the locations of the purported Bosnian pyramids